In graph theory, the outer boundary of a subgraph  of a graph  is the set of vertices of  not in  that have a common edge with a vertex in .

Graph theory